Carter Branch is a stream in the U.S. state of West Virginia.

Carter Branch has the name of William Carter, an early settler.

See also
List of rivers of West Virginia

References

Rivers of Fayette County, West Virginia
Rivers of West Virginia